Jacques Coomans  (3 November 1888 – 1980) was a Belgian racing cyclist who finished sixth in the 1919 Tour de France. He also rode in the 1919 Tour de France. Coomans was born in Magnée and died in Liège.

References

1888 births
1980 deaths
People from Fléron
Belgian male cyclists
Cyclists from Liège Province